At the 1936 Winter Olympics, five Nordic skiing events were contested – three cross-country skiing events, one ski jumping event, and one Nordic combined event, all for men only.

1936 Winter Olympics events
1936